Shanghai University (SHU) is a municipal public university located in Shanghai, China. The 555-acre main Baoshan campus is situated in the north of Shanghai, and there are two other campuses in Jiading and Jing'an. It is co-funded by Chinese Ministry of Education and Shanghai Municipal Government as part of the Project 211 and the Double First Class University Plan for leading national universities.

Jointly founded by the Nationalists and the Communists in 1922, the original cause for the Shanghai University was to nurture leaders for the Chinese revolution. It contributed a group of influential people to the cause of Chinese liberation and development. The university was discontinued in 1927 as a consequence of the Shanghai Massacre, in which the Nationalists purged all communist-related organizations. In 1983, the Chinese government reopened Shanghai University. And then in 1994, by integrating three other universities, it became the largest higher learning institution run by Shanghai Municipality. As of 2018, SHU enrolls 19,934 undergraduate and 16,954 postgraduate students, including 4,505 international students.

Shanghai University's annual research funds stood at US$505.3 million in 2018, making it a comprehensive research-intensive university. It has two undergraduate colleges and five broad academic divisions (Natural Sciences, Humanities and Social Sciences, Engineering, Economics and Management, and Fine Arts), which contain 29 schools or departments.

In the 2021 Academic Ranking of World Universities, the SHU ranked 294th worldwide and 35th in China. And in the 2021QS World University Rankings, the SHU ranked 387th and 16th, respectively. The university was also ranked 51-60 globally and 1st in China in the global young university rankings, according to the 2020 QS Top 50 Under 50. In the 2017 Ministry of Education "Chinese University Subject Rankings", the disciplines of Social Sciences, Fine Arts, and Theoretical and Applied Mechanics ranked in the top 10% of all Chinese universities; the disciplines of Mathematics, Drama and Film Studies, Mechanical Engineering, News and Communications, and Material Science and Engineering ranked in the top 20% of all Chinese universities.

History

Shanghai University (1922 to 1927)

Shanghai University was founded on Qingyun Road, Jing'an District, Shanghai in 1922 and was the outcome of the cooperation between the Kuomintang (Nationalist Party) and the Communist Party. Yu Youren, a notable member of Kuomintang, was the first president of the university. At the time under the revolutionary government led by Sun Yat-sen, Shanghai University was the top school in liberal arts, while Whampoa Military Academy was the elite academy for military training. However, Shanghai University became dominated by left wing factions sympathetic to the Chinese Communist Party. As a result, Shanghai University was closed in 1927 during the anti-Communist purges of Chiang Kai-shek (at the start of the Chinese Civil War). The old campus was destroyed during World War II.

Refoundation and merger

In 1983, the People's Republic of China government re-established Shanghai University by combining a number of existing tertiary and vocational institutions in Shanghai, including branches of Fudan University, East China Normal University, Shanghai University of Science & Technology, Shanghai Foreign Language Institute, Shanghai Mechanics College, Shanghai Fine Arts College, and the Shanghai College of Law. The university inherited the traditional focus of liberal arts, fine arts, business and law. Like many modern metropolitan universities, at the time of its re-foundation the university lacked a traditional central campus, but used a number of teaching sites spread throughout Shanghai contributed by the various tertiary and vocational institutions which had been merged to form the new university.

In 1994, a new Shanghai University was created by consolidating Shanghai University of Technology, Shanghai University of Science & Technology (上海科技大学), the existing Shanghai University (上海大学) and Shanghai Science & Technology College.

Shanghai University of Technology was once Shanghai Institute of Technology (上海工学院), founded in 1960 with a strong background of engineering, technology and industries. The institute was renamed Shanghai University of Technology in 1979. The university was located at Yanchang Road, Jing'an District, Shanghai. Professor Weichang Chien was the president of the university since 1982 and eventually led to the consolidated Shanghai University in 1994.

Shanghai University of Science & Technology was formed by the East China Branch of the Chinese Academy of Sciences (CAS) in 1958 with a close relationship to the academic and science institutes. The university was located at Chengzhong Road, Jiading District, Shanghai.

Shanghai Science & Technology College was once Shanghai No. 2 Science & Technology School established in 1959, and the school became a college in 1981.

New Shanghai University
The new Baoshan Campus, located at Shangda Road, Baoshan District, Shanghai, was constructed as the main campus of the consolidated Shanghai University. The other two campuses are the Yanchang Campus located in Jing'an District, and the Jiading Campus located in Jiading District.

Appointed by Deng Xiaoping, physicist and theoretical mechanician Qian Weichang became the president of the Shanghai University in 1982. Qian Weichang was one of the "Three Qians" (the other two are Qian Sanqiang and Qian Xuesen), who were the three scientists surnamed Qian that contributed massly to the foundation of the modern Chinese academia. He later became the longest serving president in any university in the China, a total of 28 years from 1982 he assumed office until his death in 2010. He was a well-known scientist in China, a senior fellow of the Chinese Academy of Sciences. Qian Weichang introduced a lot of reforms in the Shanghai University such as the transition to a quarterly academic calendar, the founding of an honors undergraduate college and the Shanghai Institute of Applied Mathematics and Mechanics, etc. His academic stature and personal charisma also attracted a lot of reputable researchers to join Shanghai University or to start research cooperations with the university. His death was deemed as a great loss to the university and the academia in general. President Qian's legacy is engraved deeply in the university. Many arrangements in the university after his death are designed to honor him or in the "Qian Weichang spirit".

In 2011, the vice president Luo Hongjie acted as the interim president until 2012, when he was appointed to be the next president. In 2011, he introduced the Residential College to the Shanghai University, where all newly matriculated undergraduates do not choose majors and receive general education until the end of the freshmen year.

In 2015, Chinese Academy of Engineering fellow Jin Donghan became the new president of the university. In the same year, Shanghai Film Academy was founded as a new academic branch of the university. And speculations of the intention of the university to found a new School of Medicine got widespread and partially confirmed after the university was hiring faculty to the school.

In 2019, former East China University of Science and Technology vice president, Chinese Academy of Sciences fellow Liu Changshen became the new president. A new school, the School of Mechanics and Engineering Sciences was founded.

Academics

The Shanghai University is a comprehensive university that covers a full spectrum of academic topics, including philosophy, economics, laws, literature, history, natural sciences, engineering, management, and fine arts. It hosts 30 academic departments, offering 91 baccalaureate programs, 174 master's programs, 97 doctorate programs, and 19 post-doctoral programs.

Shanghai University has 72 research institutes and an advanced high tech development park approved by the State Science Commission. Under the strategy of active involvement in China's economic expansion with technology and science research, the university has gained significant domestic and international influence in applied science research and fundamental science research. In recent years, the university ranks advanced in terms of scientific research funds, achievement awards and the number of academic theses.

Shanghai University is closely linked with the local community. The School of Life Science is co-founded with the local research institute of Chinese Academy of Sciences (CAS), and The School of Film and Television Technology are supported by film, television and broadcasting industries. The university also has joint graduate programs in literature, economics, and law with the Shanghai branch of Chinese Academy of Social Sciences.

People and disciplines 
The Shanghai University has 3178 full-time faculties, in which there are 741 full professors and 983 associate professors. 72% of the faculty holds a doctoral degree. The university also hosts 16 members of the Chinese Academy of Sciences and the Chinese Academy of Engineering. The president Liu Changsheng himself is a CAE member specializing in material science. There are another 90 professors who hold endowed or distinguished titles on other levels.

According to the 2020 Web of Science highly cited researchers list, there are 9 professors from Shanghai University listed, making SHU the third largest home institute for top 1% highly cited researchers in Shanghai, after Shanghai Jiao Tong University and Fudan University. The 2020 Essential Science Indicators also shows that 9 disciplines in Shanghai University are in the top 1% in world universities. They are engineering, material science, chemistry, physics, mathematics, computer science, bioscience, environmental science, and medicine.

The Ministry of Education designated four academic disciplines in the Shanghai University as "National Key Disciplines", including Metallurics, Mechatronics, Fluid Dynamics, and Sociology.

International cooperation 
The Shanghai University actively engages in and contributes to the international academic community. The SHU Global department has established cooperation with a wide range of universities around the world, creating opportunities for established and young scholars to visit SHU as professors, research associates, and post-doctoral researchers, as well as offering students and faculties the incentive and chance to go on international exchanges. Moreover, the university also enrolls more than 4,500 international students annually.

Sino-European School of Technology (UTSEUS) 
The school is founded jointly by Shanghai University and French leading Grandes Écoles in 2006. It is a platform of Sino-French and Sino-European teaching and research cooperation in the field of engineering. Students with better grades can switch to a French Diplôme d'Ingénieur program after 3 years of study in the school. It offers 4 undergraduate programs including Information Engineering, Mechanical Engineering and Automation, Biological Engineering and Material Science Engineering.

The Sydney Institute of Language & Commerce (SILC) 
Founded in 1994, the school is one of the earliest Sino-foreign institutes. Based on the comprehensive advantages of Shanghai University and University of Technology, Sydney, it adopts a bilingual teaching in English and Chinese. The school offers bachelor's degrees in 5 majors, namely, International Economics and Trade, Business Management, Information Management & Information System, Finance and Accounting.

Rankings

The Shanghai University witnessed a quick increase in global rankings in the recent decade, cementing its place as the top university under 50 in China. As early as in 2012, the QS World University Rankings was the first organization to recognize Shanghai University as one of the top institutions in mainland China. Interestingly, this result caused a public outcry in China on the validity of such rankings, most stated disbelief of such accomplishment for a university founded less than 30 years ago. But soon, the Academic Ranking of World Universities followed the trend, securing Shanghai University in the global top 600 in 2017, and top 300 in 2021.In addition, the major of economics is a traditional major of Shanghai University, and it has been awarded the A+ level, ranking among the top 5% of all universities in the country that set up economics disciplines.

Library

Shanghai University Library is composed of three libraries. The main library is on the Baoshan campus, Wenhui library is located on Yanchang campus, and Lianhe library resides on Jiading campus. The university library, with a total floor space of 55,000 square meters, has 25 reading rooms and 3,000 seats. The main library occupies approximately 38,000 square meters.

The libraries contain more than 3 million volumes, more than 4,600 periodicals, and many electronic resources including Elsevier, Ebsco, Kluwer, and Academic Press. The library materials are comprehensive and cover diversified areas. In cooperation with Shanghai Writer's Association, the main library has a collection room for Shanghai writer's works.

Special collections
Ancient Books Reading Room: Collecting "Imperial Collection of Four" ("Si Ku Quan Shu") and the Qing dynasty thread-bound ancient books.
Hong Kong & Taiwan Book Collections: Containing 15,000 books, magazines, and newspapers published in Hong Kong and Taiwan.
Shanghai Writer's Works Display Room: Collecting 1,500 celebrity authors' books.
Fine Arts Reading Room: Containing nearly 10,000 books to support the faculty and students from the College of Fine Arts, Shanghai University.
Ancient Writing & Modern History Writing Reading Room: Collecting 9,000 ancient books published in recent years, 25,000 periodicals, as well as modern Chinese newspaper photocopy.

Notable alumni and faculty

Notable faculty members
Deng Weizhi, a Standing Committee Member of the 9th CPPCC National Committee, a professor at the Department of Sociology, the Chinese Academy of Social Sciences (CASS)
Fu Jiamo (傅家谟), academician of the Chinese Academy of Sciences (CAS)
Huang Hongjia (黄宏嘉), academician of the CAS，honorary president of Shanghai University
Li Sanli (李三立), academician of the Chinese Academy of Engineering (CAE)
Liu Gaolian (刘高联), academician of the CAS
Liu Renhuai (刘人怀), academician of the CAE, president of Jinan University (暨南大学, in Guangdong, China), professor of Shanghai University of Technology from 1986 to 1991
Liu Yuanfang (刘元方), academician of the CAS
Liu Yuanzhang (刘源张), academician of the CAE and the International Academy for Quality
Sun Jinliang (孙晋良), academician of the CAE
Xie Jin (谢晋), film director, member of the Academy of Motion Picture Arts and Sciences (AMPAS, 美国电影艺术与科学学院)
Xu Kuangdi (徐匡迪), chair and academician of the CAE, former mayor of Shanghai
Zhou Bangxing (周邦新), academician of the CAE
Zhou Guozhi (周国治), academician of the CAS

Notable alumni
Yang Shangkun (杨尚昆), 4th president of the People's Republic of China, enrolled in Department of Sociology of Shanghai University in 1926.
Bo Gu (博古), was a senior leader of the Chinese Communist Party and a member of the 28 Bolsheviks, enrolled in Department of Sociology of Shanghai University in 1925.
Wang Jiaxiang (王稼祥), one of the senior leaders of the Chinese Communist Party in its early stage and a member of the 28 Bolsheviks, attended the affiliated middle school of Shanghai University in 1925.
Xu jishen (许继慎), was a senior commander of Chinese Workers' and Peasants Red Army, enrolled in Shanghai University in 1923.
Zhang Zhizhong (张治中), was a general in the National Revolutionary Army of the Republic of China, enrolled in Department of Sociology of Shanghai University in 1923.
Chen Geng (陈赓), was a Chinese Communist military leader, one of the ten grand generals of the People's Liberation Army, attended Shanghai University as an auditor.
Li Shuoxun (李硕勋), revolutionary martyr, an underground leader of Chinese Communist Party, entered Shanghai University in 1923.
Zhang Qinqiu (张琴秋), was a Chinese Communist revolutionary, military commander, and politician, entered the sociology department of the Shanghai University.
Chen Yifei (陈逸飞), famous film director, artist, graduated from Shanghai Fine Arts College in 1965.
Scott Shaw, American writer and artist, received his Ph.D. from Shanghai University in Asian Studies.
Xin Zhou (周忻), Chairman & CEO of E-House China (NYSE: EJ), graduated from Shanghai University of Technology in 1990.

Campuses

The main campus is located in the Baoshan district of Shanghai. Most of the undergraduates will spend their entire four college years on this campus, with few exceptions like those who are admitted into the SILC. The Baoshan Campus is the most recently built campus of SHU, and the east district of which is still under construction. There are two libraries on this campus. The iconic Main Library, and Qianweichang Library built in the remembrance of the late and former president of the university, Weichang Chien.
A half-circular lake named Panchi (泮池, lit. "half-a-lake") is at the center of this campus. The name of the lake is given to honor Confucius. According to the Rites of Zhou, Panchis are built at the palaces of the feudal kings. As Confucius was bestowed the title of King Wenxuan during the Tang dynasty, a Panchi was built at every Temple of Confucius. Later, Panchis lost their original meaning as "lakes built for the kings", but became an icon for Confucius, Chinese academia and scholars. And the school entrance ceremony for all the newly admitted students are called "Rupan" (lit. "entering the Panchi").

More, there are seven main lecture buildings and several supplementary lecture buildings, two auditorium buildings, three on-campus dorm sites, an indoor sporting complex, and several outdoor sporting fields and courts.

The university also has branch campuses in Jiading and Jing'an.

See also

 List of universities in China
 Shanghai University Computer Engineering Science School
 High School Affiliated to Shanghai University
 j

References

External links
SHU Official Website in 
Shanghai University Alumni Association
Shanghai University Library
Shanghai University e-Learning

 
Universities and colleges in Shanghai
Project 211
Plan 111
1922 establishments in China
Universities and colleges formed by merger in China